The  was the first imperially commissioned Japanese kanshi collection. It was compiled by Ono no Minemori, Sugawara no Kiyotomo and others under the command of Emperor Saga. The text was completed in 814.

Title

The title, Ryōunshū, is an allusion to poetry so great that it soars higher than the clouds.

Contents

The text begins with a preface outlining the background for and editorial principles surrounding the subject matter. The main text contains 91 poems contributed by 24 authors composed in kanshi style. The poems were ordered by author.

References
 
 

Late Old Japanese texts
Heian period in literature
Japanese poetry collections
Kanshi (poetry)